Dismorphia crisia, the crisia mimic white or cloud forest mimic-white, is a butterfly in the family Pieridae. The species was first described by Dru Drury in 1782. It is found from northern Central America to Bolivia and the Amazon basin.

It is a very variable species.

The larvae feed on Inga and Pithecellobium species.

Subspecies
The following subspecies are recognised:
D. c. crisia (Panama, Venezuela, Colombia, Brazil: Rio de Janeiro, Rio Grande do Sul, Minas Gerais)
D. c. foedora (Lucas, 1852) (Venezuela, Peru, Colombia)
D. c. virgo (Bates, 1864) (Guatema, Costa Rica, Mexico)
D. c. lubina Butler, 1872 (Costa Rica to Panama)
D. c. tolimensis Fassl, 1915 (Colombia)
D. c. interrupta Talbot, 1932 (Colombia)
D. c. roraimae Hall, 1939 (Guyana)
D. c. saltensis Breyer, 1939 (Argentina, Bolivia)
D. c. neblina Reissinger, 1970 (Venezuela)
D. c. alvarezi J. & R. G. Maza, 1984 (Mexico)
D. c. steinhauseri J. & R. G. Maza, 1984 (El Salvador)
D. c. anamaria Lamas, 2004 (Peru)
D. c. sylvia Lamas, 2004 (Peru)

Gallery

References

Dismorphiinae
Butterflies described in 1782
Fauna of Brazil
Pieridae of South America